The Newark Sailors, later known as the Newark Indians, were a minor league baseball team in the early twentieth century. The team played its games at Wiedenmayer's Park in Newark, New Jersey. Newark played in the Eastern League between 1908 and 1911, and they played in the International League from 1912 to 1916.

The team featured strong pitching. In 1908, Tom Hughes led the Eastern League in strikeouts. In 1909, Joe McGinnity led in wins (29), games (55) and strikeouts (195) while allowing just 297 hits in 422 innings. In 1910, McGinnity won 30 games and Rube Waddell finished with a 5–3 record. McGinnity continued as player-manager for two more years.

The team won the International League pennant in 1913, but the following year they slipped to fifth. In 1915, the Indians suddenly had competition: the Indianapolis Hoosiers of the Federal League moved to town, renamed the Newark Peppers. The Indians could not compete with the major-league Peppers, and moved to Harrisburg, Pennsylvania on July 2, 1915.

The following season, the Federal League was dead and the Indians returned to Newark, even playing in the Peppers' old (but still brand-new) ballpark, Harrison Park. But the Indians finished dead last in 1916, and were replaced by the Newark Bears in 1917. (The Bears would continue playing in the old FL stadium until it burned down in 1924.)

Year-by-year record

References

Defunct International League teams
Defunct Eastern League (1938–present) teams
Professional baseball teams in New Jersey
1908 establishments in New Jersey
1916 disestablishments in New Jersey
Baseball teams established in 1908
Baseball teams disestablished in 1916
Defunct baseball teams in New Jersey